Tia Sáng ('The Spark'/'Light ray') is a Vietnamese Science and Technology magazine created in 1991 under the Ministry of Science and Technology. It is considered a platform for intellectuals to raise their voice about policymaking decisions in Vietnam.

History 

Tia Sang was founded in April 1991. Among Tia Sang’s first contributors are Hoang Tuy, the founder of Vietnamese mathematics; Phan Dinh Dieu who helped to build the ICT field in Vietnam; Viet Phuong, a poet, former secretary of Le Duan; Le Dat, one of the pioneers in Nhan Van – Giai Pham movement, writer Nguyen Ngoc.

Many articles published in Tia Sang were featured and discussed on BBC (Vietnamese version) such as Hoang Tuy’s article about the intellectuals’ attitude toward the social issues in Vietnam or the opinion piece of Tuong Lai, former director of Institute of Sociology about what communist party’s mission should be. Tia Sang’s website was forced offline in 2009 by the government for several months because of its ‘sensitive’ articles. Some contributors of Tia Sang were or are prisoners of conscience such as Pham Doan Trang, Le Cong Dinh.

Since the late 2000s, Tia Sang has been less critical towards the government and took the solution journalism approach. It still maintains its position as a bridge between the science community and the mass. Its notable and frequent contributor nowadays is Pierre Darriulat, former research director of CERN.

It merged with the Development Science Newspaper (Báo Khoa học Phát triển) in 2017.

Tia Sang's advocacy of integrity and transparency in science resulted in the establishment of The National Foundation for Science and Technology of Vietnam (NAFOSTED). NAFOSTED is a science funding mechanism in Vietnam that gives scientists more freedom in doing research but demands higher quality in their scientific output. Tia Sang also co-founded the Ta Quang Buu Prize that tribute scientists in basic science. Tia Sang also initiates annually STEM Day to promote science communication and public outreach of the science community in Vietnam.

References

External links 
 Official website 

Newspapers published in Vietnam
Science and technology magazines
Magazines established in 1991